George Harry Cave (1874–1904) was an English footballer who played in the Football League for West Bromwich Albion.

References

1874 births
1904 deaths
English footballers
Association football defenders
English Football League players
Great Bridge Unity F.C. players
West Bromwich Albion F.C. players